The Rivière Soliette (in Haiti) or Arroyo Blanco (in the Dominican Republic) is a river in the southwest of the Dominican Republic and Haiti. On 24 May 2004, it overran its banks resulting in the death of over one thousand individuals, with hundreds more injured and homeless near the city of Jimani.

References

Rivers of the Dominican Republic
Rivers of Haiti
International rivers of North America